Julie Ann Brown (born February 4, 1955) is an American retired distance runner. She won the IAAF World Cross Country Championship in 1975 and represented the United States in the 1984 Summer Olympics in the women's marathon, placing 36th.

Brown set the American women's marathon record at the Nike OTC Marathon in 1978, running 2:36:23.

Brown concentrated on track and cross-country running prior to the Olympic trials but a victory in the Avon Women's Marathon in 1983 convinced her that she could qualify for the Olympic marathon team.  She ran a conservative race staying in the pack until the midway point and broke away finishing second, 37 seconds behind the Olympic trials winner, Joan Benoit Samuelson. She broke the 10,000 metres world record setting a time of 35:00.4 minutes in 1975.

After her track career, Brown received her J.D. from Western State University and, joined a law firm as an attorney.

High school
Brown was born in Billings, Montana, and competed in a variety of distance events winning several state championships while attending Billings Senior High School.  She competed in the 880-yard run winning the state championship for three years in a row starting in 1970. She still holds the All-State record with an 880-yard time of 2:11.0.  She also won two 440-yard run championships and in her senior year, she was state cross-country champion as well.

College
Brown started at the University of California, Los Angeles before switching to California State University, Northridge. As a college athlete she won Association for Intercollegiate Athletics for Women national championships in the 800 meters, 1500 meters, 3000 meters, and cross-country. Brown recalls how her UCLA cross country coach mistreated her and because of the environment at UCLA she decided to transfer to CSUN. She also won Amateur Athletic Union national titles in the 1500 meters, 3000 meters, cross-country, and marathon, as well as winning The Athletics Congress national titles in 3000 meters, cross-country, and marathon.

US Championships
Julie Brown ended her running career in 1985 as a 13-time national champion and 20-time Team USA member either in track and cross country.

Brown placed 8th at 1985 New York Marathon in 2:37:53 and 2nd at 1982 New York Marathon in 2:28:33. Brown won 1981 Dallas Marathon in 2:33:40.

International
Brown placed 27th at 1974 IAAF World Cross Country Championships – Senior women's race in 13:34.8.

Brown won an IAAF World Cross Country Championship in 1975 in 13:42; the first American woman to do so.  She won the race in a time of 13:42, five seconds ahead of Bronisława Ludwichowska from Poland.

At the 1979 Pan American Games, Brown won three silver medals, taking second place in the 800 meters, 1500 meters, and 3000 meters.

After graduating from CSUN, Brown moved to San Diego to train for the 1980 Olympics.

Brown qualified for the 1980 Summer Olympics in the 800 meters and 1500 meters but did not compete due to the boycott of the Olympics. She was one of 461 athletes to receive a Congressional Gold Medal instead. 

She entered the marathon at the inaugural 1983 World Championships in Athletics, but failed to finish the competition.

Brown was sponsored by Adidas who set her up with coach Bill Dellinger and moved her from California to Eugene, Oregon in 1983 so she could focus on the marathon distance. 

Bobbi Gibb, the first woman to have run the entire Boston Marathon, sculpted three 12-inch bronze figurines of a running pony-tailed girl that were given as trophies to Joan Benoit Samuelson, Julie Brown, and Julie Isphording, the top three women marathoners at the US Olympic trials in 1984. Julie Brown trained on President Reagan's Santa Barbara, California ranch prior to 1984 Olympic Games to adjust to the heat and humidity of 1984 Los Angeles Olympics. Brown did compete in the 1984 Olympics in the marathon, placing 36th.

Brown was later sponsored by Champion products; Brown was featured in magazines in an international ad for Vaseline - Sponsored Athletes in the 1980's only made six figures, so Julie Brown went to law school at night to pursue a career.

In July 2008, President Carter gave the 1980 Team USA athletes Congressional Congressional Gold Medal.

References

External links

 
 Julie Ann Brown at Olympics.com

1955 births
Living people
Sportspeople from Billings, Montana
Track and field athletes from Montana
American female long-distance runners
American female marathon runners
American female cross country runners
Olympic track and field athletes of the United States
Athletes (track and field) at the 1984 Summer Olympics
Pan American Games track and field athletes for the United States
Pan American Games medalists in athletics (track and field)
Pan American Games silver medalists for the United States
Athletes (track and field) at the 1979 Pan American Games
World Athletics Championships athletes for the United States
World Athletics Cross Country Championships winners
World record setters in athletics (track and field)
UCLA Bruins women's track and field athletes
California State University, Northridge alumni
Cal State Northridge Matadors women's track and field athletes
Western State University College of Law alumni
Congressional Gold Medal recipients
Medalists at the 1979 Pan American Games
20th-century American women